BU, Bu and variations may refer to:

In business
 Business unit, a division within a company, as in strategic business unit
 Braathens (IATA airline designator)
 British United Shoe Machinery, Leicester UK
 Bücker Flugzeugbau, a German aircraft manufacturer whose planes were designated 'Bü'

Places
 Bû, a settlement in France
 Bulgaria (country code)
 Burma (Myanmar) (former ISO3166-1 country code)

In mathematics, science, and technology
 -Bu, a common shorthand for butyl, a functional group in organic chemistry
 BU(n), in mathematics, the classifying space for the unitary group U(n)
 Backup, in information technology
 Bethesda unit, a measure of inhibitor activity relating to a coagulation factor
 Biological unit, the smallest number of protein molecules which form a biologically active unit
 Brabender unit, a unit of flour analysis measured by a farinograph
 Billion Units, used in India to mean billion kWh ie equal to one TeraWatt-hour (see Kilowatt-hour#Multiples)

Units of measure
 bu, a Japanese unit of length, equivalent to 3.03 millimeters
 bù (步), a Chinese unit of length, equivalent to 1.66 meters
 Bushel, a unit of capacity

Universities

United States
 Boston University, Boston, Massachusetts
 Baker University, Baldwin City, Kansas
 Barry University, Miami Shores, Florida
 Baylor University, Waco, Texas
 Belhaven University, Jackson, Mississippi
 Bellarmine University, Louisville, Kentucky
 Bellevue University, Bellevue, Nebraska
 Belmont University, Nashville, Tennessee
 Bentley University, Waltham, Massachusetts
 Bethel University (Indiana), Mishawaka, Indiana
 Bethel University (Minnesota), Arden Hills, Minnesota
 Bethel University (Tennessee), McKenzie, Tennessee
 Bethesda University, Anaheim, California
 Binghamton University, Vestal, New York
 Biola University, La Mirada, California
 Bloomsburg University of Pennsylvania
 Bluffton University, Bluffton, Ohio
 Bradley University, Peoria, Illinois
 Brandeis University, Waltham, Massachusetts
 Brandman University, Irvine, California
 Brenau University, Gainesville, Georgia
 Brescia University, Owensboro, Kentucky
 Brown University, Providence, Rhode Island
 Bryant University, Smithfield, Rhode Island
 Bucknell University, Lewisburg, Pennsylvania
 Bushnell University, Eugene, Oregon
 Butler University, Indianapolis, Indiana

United Kingdom
 Bangor University, north Wales
 Birmingham University or University of Birmingham, central England
 Bournemouth University, Dorset, England
 Brunel University, London, England

Turkey
 Bilkent University, Ankara
 Boğaziçi University, Istanbul

Bangladesh
 BRAC University, Bangladesh
 Barisal University, Bangladesh
 Bangladesh University, Mohammadpur, Dhaka, Bangladesh

India
 Bangalore University, Bangalore, India
 Bhavnagar University, Gujarat, India
 Bundelkhand University, Jhansi, India
 Bharathiar University, Coimbatore, India
 Bharathidasan University, Tiruchirapalli, India

Uganda
 Bugema University, a university in Uganda affiliated with the Seventh-day Adventist Church
 Busitema University, Tororo, Uganda
 Busoga University, Jinja, Uganda

Other countries
 Benha University, Egypt
 Brandon University, Manitoba, Canada
 Bishop's University, Quebec, Canada
 Hong Kong Baptist University, Kowloon Tsai, Hong Kong
 Bahria University, Islamabad, Karachi and Lahore, Pakistan
 Bicol University, Philippines
 University of Belgrade, Serbia
 Benadir University, Mogadishu, Somalia
 Bangkok University, Bangkok Metropolitan Region, Thailand

Other uses
 Bu language
 Bu (instrument), a traditional Korean musical instrument
 Bu (surname), a Chinese surname
 Brilliant Uncirculated, or Beautiful Uncirculated, in numismatic coin grading
 Builder (US Navy), a Seabee occupational rating in the U.S. Navy
 Bu, Kasih Suci or Bu, a 2019 Malaysian Malay-language family drama film

See also 
Buu (disambiguation)